Robert Cory Bryar (born December 31, 1979) is an American retired musician and sound engineer best known as the drummer of the rock band My Chemical Romance. The longest tenured and last official drummer, he performed in the band from 2004 until his departure in 2010.

Bryar joined the band replacing former drummer Matt Pelissier shortly after the release of their second studio album Three Cheers for Sweet Revenge (2004). He performed on all of the subsequent releases in support of the album, as well as the band's commercially successful concept album, The Black Parade (2006). Despite suffering numerous injuries while on tour, Bryar continued to tour with the band and joined them in the studio to record their fourth studio album before departing from My Chemical Romance in 2010. His most recent contribution was performing on the band's final release before their break-up in 2013, Conventional Weapons. After his departure from the band, Bryar became a behind-the-scenes figure in tours for several bands before retiring from music in 2014. He subsequently became a real estate agent and an active supporter of dog rescue charities and sanctuaries.

Early life 
Bryar was born in Chicago, Illinois, on December 31, 1979. He started playing drums at a young age, performing in his school's marching and jazz bands. After graduation, Bryar studied for a degree in sound engineering at The University of Florida Florida.

Career

My Chemical Romance (2004–2010) 
In 2000, Bryar began working as a touring sound engineer for rock bands including The Used and Thrice. During this time, he befriended My Chemical Romance while the band was on tour with The Used in 2004. Bryar became the drummer for My Chemical Romance after the band's tour in Japan, officially replacing former drummer Matt Pelissier shortly after the release of the band's second studio album Three Cheers for Sweet Revenge (2004).

Bryar was featured in all of the music videos for Three Cheers for Sweet Revenge (except the first version of the video for "I'm Not Okay"; he was featured in the second version), and also performed on all of the subsequent releases in support of the album including Life on the Murder Scene and ¡Venganza!. Bryar performed on My Chemical Romance's third studio album The Black Parade (2006). The album was favored by music critics and was a commercial success, being awarded double platinum status in the United Kingdom and the United States. Bryar and lead vocalist Gerard Way were injured during the filming of the music video for "Famous Last Words" directed by Samuel Bayer, with Bryar suffering third-degree burns on his hands and legs after he caught fire when he was too close to the flames. Their injuries caused the band to cancel their performance at the San Diego Street Scene festival. A month later, the band missed two tour dates after Bryar was hospitalized with a staph infection also caused during the filming of the music video. The band released a statement two days later, apologizing for cancelling shows, stating that they "want to be by his side the whole time". When the band went on The Black Parade World Tour in support of the album in February 2007, he began having complications in his wrist in November, causing the band to cancel their show in Maine. In response to his recent injuries, Bryar apologized on the band's MySpace, explaining that he has had problems with his wrist "over the past few years", and that he received a "golf ball-sized lump" in his wrist and began to "lose control and feeling in [his] fingers". He sat out for the tour and the band continued with Pete Parada as his temporary replacement. Although Bryar was unable to perform, he continued to tour with the band and assist with pyrotechnics and returned for the last leg of the tour in January 2008.

My Chemical Romance reentered the studio in 2009 to record their fourth studio album with producer Brendan O'Brien. On July 31 and August 1, they played two "secret" shows at the Roxy Theatre in Los Angeles, performing unreleased material from their upcoming album, including a song titled "Death Before Disco".

On March 3, 2010, rhythm guitarist Frank Iero announced on their official website that Bryar had departed from the band, writing:

Post-My Chemical Romance (2010–present) 

The band released their fourth studio album Danger Days: The True Lives of the Fabulous Killjoys in 2010 with Bryar being credited on writing five songs including the singles "Na Na Na (Na Na Na Na Na Na Na Na Na)" and "The Only Hope for Me Is You".

The band released Conventional Weapons, a compilation album consisting of ten unreleased songs that were recorded in 2009 prior to Bryar's departure and the making of Danger Days: The True Lives of the Fabulous Killjoys, all of which include Bryar performing drums. They released two songs each month from October 2012 to February 2013. My Chemical Romance broke up in March 2013.

After his departure, Bryar continued being involved in the music business as a behind-the-scenes figure in tours for several bands. On October 2, 2014, Bryar announced his departure from music, subsequently becoming a real estate agent. However, in February 2015, he announced his interest in returning to music.

On July 20, 2016, My Chemical Romance posted on their official Twitter and Facebook pages a video with the piano intro from "Welcome to the Black Parade", ending with a cryptic date, "9/23/16". The video was also published on the band's YouTube channel with the video titled "MCRX". This led to numerous rumors and reports on the band's possible reunion until it was revealed to be a reissue of The Black Parade with unreleased demos. The reissue, titled The Black Parade/Living with Ghosts, includes 11 demos and live tracks. In September 2016, Bryar was featured in an exclusive interview with Alternative Press to promote the new album. In his first interview since departing from the band, Bryar recalled multiple memories of recording and touring The Black Parade.

In January 2020, Bryar participated in a remembrance for Rush drummer Neil Peart, recalling his "teenage obsession" and friendship with Peart. In June 2021, Bryar announced that he was "permanently closing the book on [his] drumming days," citing his ongoing wrist issues, old age, weight, and his desire to pursue "something new."

Equipment

During his time with My Chemical Romance, Bryar was known for using kits made by C&C, a custom drum company based in Gladstone, Missouri, paired with Sabian "Paragon" cymbals and Remo heads. Bryar played Vic Firth’s "ROCK" sticks, until switching to Vater’s "XD-Rock" sticks in 2007.

Bryar’s kits were notable for their bizarre specifications, with his tom drums being incredibly shallow in depth, and his snare drums being much deeper.

Philanthropy 
Since his departure from My Chemical Romance, Bryar has been very active in dog rescue charities and sanctuaries. In June 2021, Bryar auctioned his Helena-themed drum kit on eBay and dedicated the money to the Williamson County Animal Control and Adoption Center located in Franklin, Tennessee. In October 2022, Bryar auctioned his uniform from The Black Parade on eBay and dedicated the money to abandoned and sheltered animals in Florida and South Carolina that were  affected by Hurricane Ian, stating that "it's just sitting in a box doing nothing and people need help with money right now."

Discography 
My Chemical Romance

 "All I Want for Christmas Is You" (2004; Mariah Carey cover)
 "Under Pressure" (2005; with The Used; Queen/David Bowie cover)
 Warped Tour Bootleg Series (2005)
 Life on the Murder Scene (2006) 
 The Black Parade (2006)
 Live and Rare (2007)
 AOL Sessions (2007)
 The Black Parade Is Dead! (2008) 
 The Black Parade: The B-Sides (2009)
 ¡Venganza! (2009)
 Danger Days: The True Lives of the Fabulous Killjoys (2010; credit only)
 Conventional Weapons (2012–2013)
 May Death Never Stop You (2014; greatest hits album)
 The Black Parade/Living with Ghosts (2016; The Black Parade reissue)

References

External links 
My Chemical Romance official website

1979 births
American audio engineers
American male drummers
American real estate brokers
Alternative rock drummers
Punk rock drummers
American rock drummers
American rock musicians
Living people
Musicians from Chicago
My Chemical Romance members
20th-century American drummers
21st-century American drummers